South Newbury is an unincorporated community in Geauga County, in the U.S. state of Ohio.

History
One of the earliest schoolhouses in the area was built in South Newbury in 1820. A post office called South Newbury was established in 1868, and remained in operation until 1907.

References

Unincorporated communities in Geauga County, Ohio
Unincorporated communities in Ohio